Kennedy–Kenrick Catholic High School was a private Roman Catholic high school in Norristown, Pennsylvania, United States, in the Roman Catholic Archdiocese of Philadelphia.

Background
Kennedy–Kenrick Catholic High School was established through a merger of Archbishop Kennedy High School in Conshohocken and Bishop Kenrick High School in Norristown, and opened in September 1993. It ultimately served the communities of Andorra, Blue Bell, Conshohocken, Lafayette Hill, Norristown, Roxborough, many parts of Eastern and Northern Montgomery County, and the communities on the Philadelphia/Montgomery line. Open enrollment, which was established throughout the Philadelphia Archdiocesan School System in September 1993, admitted students from all the Philadelphia/Montgomery County areas.

Athletics
Although Kennedy–Kenrick was a smaller school, their programs were not negatively affected. The field hockey team won the PCL Championships (2008) after knocking out first place rival Archbishop Carroll.

 Fall sports: football, boys' soccer, boys' cross country, golf, field hockey, girls' soccer, volleyball, girls' cross country 
 Winter sports: boys' basketball, girls' basketball, wrestling, bowling
 Spring sports: baseball, softball, boys' lacrosse, girls' lacrosse, boys' outdoor track, girls' outdoor track

Merger
On January 28, 2008, the archdiocese announced that a new high school in Upper Providence Township, Montgomery County, would replace Kennedy–Kenrick and St. Pius X High School in Lower Pottsgrove Township.

The new school, Pope John Paul II High School, is a  facility. It opened in September 2010.

The final year
The final academic school year for Kennedy–Kenrick started on September 9, 2009. Throughout the year, the faculty and staff created special activities on the 17th of every month, as the 2009–2010 year marked the school's 17th and final year in operation.

The last senior class celebrated its Baccalaureate Liturgy on Monday, June 1, 2010, at Visitation B.V.M. Parish in Norristown, Pennsylvania.

Graduation for the last senior class of Kennedy–Kenrick, the Class of 2010, took place on Tuesday, June 2, 2010, at Gwynedd-Mercy College.

The official last day of school for current freshmen, sophomores, and juniors was Thursday, June 10, 2010, and was celebrated with a special liturgy celebrating the legacies of the four schools that led to Kennedy–Kenrick.

Notable alumni
Joe Harvey, Class of 2010, baseball player
Christian Walker, Class of 2009, baseball player
Chris Lubanski, Class of 2003, baseball player

External links
 Pope John Paul II website

Notes and references

Defunct Catholic secondary schools in Pennsylvania
Educational institutions established in 1993
Educational institutions disestablished in 2010
Schools in Montgomery County, Pennsylvania
1993 establishments in Pennsylvania
Defunct schools in Pennsylvania
2010 disestablishments in Pennsylvania